Lieutenant-Colonel Sir Claude Edward Marjoribanks Dansey, KCMG (10 September 1876 – 11 June 1947), also known as Colonel Z, Haywood, Uncle Claude, and codenamed Z, was the assistant chief of the Secret Intelligence Service known as ACSS, of the British intelligence agency commonly known as MI6, and a member of the London Controlling Section. He began his career in intelligence in 1900, and remained active until his death.

Early life 
Dansey was born in 1876 at 14 Cromwell Place, Kensington, the second of nine children and eldest son of Captain (later Lieutenant-Colonel) Edward Mashiter Dansey, an officer in the 1st Life Guards, and his wife, the Hon. Eleanor Dansey, daughter of Robert Gifford, 2nd Baron Gifford. He attended Wellington College until 1891, and then a private school in Bruges. At the age of 17 he became sexually involved with Robert Baldwin Ross, and Lord Alfred Douglas, narrowly avoiding exposure and imprisonment.

Later life 
In 1895 he joined the Matabeleland Regiment of the British South African Police. On 13 June 1898 he joined the militia as second lieutenant in the 5th and 6th battalion Lancashire Fusiliers, being promoted to lieutenant on 9 November. On 16 August 1899 he was seconded for service with the British North Borneo Company. He transferred to the regular army when he was appointed a second lieutenant of the 2nd battalion on 24 February 1900, followed by promotion to lieutenant on 15 August 1900. On 1 March 1902 he was again seconded, as a Staff Lieutenant for Intelligence in South Africa, then on 24 June he was appointed aide-de-camp to the Brigadier-General commanding the Harrismith District, Charles James Blomfield. He was transferred from a supernumerary lieutenancy onto the establishment of his regiment on 17 September 1902. On 4 November 1904 he was seconded for "special extra-regimental employment" as a Political Advisor in the British Somaliland Protectorate and on 24 October 1906 he resigned his commission. On 10 April 1907 he was promoted to captain on the Reserve of Officers.

He was recruited by MI5 and put in charge of "port intelligence" and the surveillance of civilian passengers during World War I. He was "inadvertently" responsible for allowing Leon Trotsky to return to Russia in 1917. He helped set up the first American military intelligence service in 1917.  He became deputy to Stewart Menzies, chief of MI6 (SIS), after the death of Hugh Sinclair.
 in November 1939 and retired in 1945.

Personal life 
Dansey married Mrs Pauline Monroe Ulman (maiden surname Cory) in 1915 and they were later divorced.  He married Mrs Frances Gurney Rylander (Maiden surname Wilson) in 1945.  There were no children. Dansey died on 11 June 1947 in Bath, Somerset.

References

Further reading 
Brown, Anthony Cave (1987) 'C' The Secret Life of Sir Stewart Graham Menzies, spymaster to Winston Churchill, Macmillan Publishing Company, New York, 
Andrew, Christopher (1986). Her Majesty’s Secret Service: The Making of the British Intelligence Community, .New York: Viking, .

   Marshall declared the culprit was homosexual, allegedly, and Freemason, Deputy Head of MI-6, Sir Claude Edward Marjoribanks Dansey (1876-1947.)
 
 

1876 births
1947 deaths
Military personnel from London
Pre–World War I spies
World War I spies for the United Kingdom
MI5 personnel
Secret Intelligence Service personnel
British Militia officers
British Army personnel of the Second Boer War
Lancashire Fusiliers officers
British Army personnel of World War I
World War II spies for the United Kingdom